Somatina obscuriciliata is a moth of the family Geometridae. It is found in south-eastern China.

References

Moths described in 1924
Scopulini